Mantra Dandam ( Magical Wand) is a 1951 Telugu-language fantasy swashbuckler film, produced by C. K. C. Chitti under the Sri Gnanambika Pictures banner and directed by K. S. Ramachandra Rao. It stars Akkineni Nageswara Rao, Sriranjani Jr.  and music composed by Nallam Nageswara Rao, while S. Rajeswara Rao has taken care of the background score.

The film was dubbed into Tamil with the title Arasaala Piranthavan and released in 1958.

Plot
Once upon a time, there was a kingdom, and its queen departed after giving birth to a baby boy. Just after, the younger Queen ploys and dumps him in the forest. Here, the baby is safeguarded by a Yogini who rears him as Siva Prasad. Years roll by, and Siva Prasad falls for a florist Gowri and a naughty girl Girija also behind him. After some time, Siva Prasad & Gowri move to the capital, Girija's posteriors, and they split in between. At the fort, the King opts for Siva Prasad as his heir as a royal elephant facilitates him. Simultaneously, Gowri enrolls with the queen, and Girija is seized by a sorcerer Tintakarala one that aids the queen. After some time, Gowri is indicted for a theft done by the queen's brother when Siva Prasad punishes her imperatively. Soon, he proves her guiltless and ascertains to knit her which the King opposes. During this, the queen realizes Siva Prasad is the prince by his birthmark. So, she conspires to eliminate him via Tintakarala and he utilizes Girija by creating a magic wand to clutch Siva Prasad. Discerning it, she absconds together with Magic Wand. Forthwith, Gowri is apprehended and penalized for death within 7 days. Afterward, aware of Siva Prasad's love for Gowri Girija proceeds to slay her when the queen's brother heists Magic Wand. Parallelly, the King discloses the fact when the queen commits suicide. However, Tintakarala captures Siva Prasad and judges him to sacrifice. Distressed King hits his cave under the umbrella of Yogini. At last, Siva Prasad eliminates Tintakarala when Girija dies while guarding her love. All at once, Gowri is edged to hang and frees her. Finally, the movie ends on a happy note with the marriage of Siva Prasad & Gowri.

Cast

Akkineni Nageswara Rao as Siva Prasad
Sriranjani Jr. as Gowri
C.S.R as Maharaju
Kasturi Siva Rao as Shankara Sarma
Ram Murthy as Sambaiah
Linga Murthy as Tintakarala, a wizard
Aadiseshaiah as Mahamantri
Ganapathi Bhattu as Rajagaru
Suryanarayana as Kothvalu
Kanchi Narasimham as Maavati 
Krishna Kumari as Bhavani
Surabhi Balasaraswathi as Girija
B. Jayamma as Yogini
C. Hemalata Devi as Chinna Rani
K. Jayalakshmi as Pedda Rani
C. Varalakshmi as Durga
Radio Bhanumathi as Gowri's mother
Kantha Devi as Dancer

Soundtrack

Music composed by Nallam Nageswara Rao. Lyrics were written by Tapi Dharma Rao. Music released on Audio Company.

References

1950s Telugu-language films
Indian fantasy adventure films
1950s fantasy adventure films
Films based on Indian folklore
Films scored by S. Rajeswara Rao